Totally Rad, known in Japan as , is an action-adventure game developed by Aicom and published by Jaleco for the Nintendo Entertainment System. The game was released in Japan on September 28, 1990, in Europe in 1990 and in North America on March 29, 1991.

Gameplay 
 Multiple boss fights ranging in complexity
 Special summoning abilities
 Side-scrolling platform game

Plot 

Jake (John in the Japanese version) is hired as an apprentice magician by Zebediah Pong (simply referred to as Pong in the Japanese version). He is training when some strange people attack and kidnap his girlfriend, Allison (Yuu in the Japanese version). Jake goes on a quest to find out where they came from and why they wanted Allison. Afterwards, Jake discovers Allison's kidnapping was a feint to force Allison's father, a renowned scientist, out of hiding. Jake must not only save Allison's father, but ultimately battle an evil king who plans to lead a subterranean army in a battle against the people of Jake's world.

The Japanese and North American versions of the game are mostly the same, except for the characters. In the original 'Magic John', the main characters are two preadolescent, Japanese-style cartoon friends. In 'Totally Rad', they are redesigned into becoming two Californian adolescents who talk in "surfer" lingo from the 1980s.

Manual 
The instruction manual for Totally Rad is filled with surfer lingo, in addition to comical picture breaks and comments about the author's "babe" and how attractive she looks in the picture he put of her in the instruction manual.

Reception 

Mean Machines magazine gave the game a score of 63 out of 100 giving criticism to the lack of challenge in the first few levels, repetitive action, over simplistic gameplay and concluding “A reasonable game which misses out on brilliance due to over-simplification of the gameplay and unoriginal gameplay.”

References

External links
 Official website at Jaleco 

 Totally Rad at MobyGames
 The Rad Project - A comparison of the original Japanese version with the Western revision.
 Totally Rad Game Review (With Cut Scenes) - A complete transcript of the game's cut scenes and storyboard side by side with a game review.
 Totally Rad instruction manual

1990 video games
Action-adventure games
Aicom games
Jaleco games
Nintendo Entertainment System games
Nintendo Entertainment System-only games
Platform games
Science fiction video games
Side-scrolling video games
Video games developed in Japan
Single-player video games